Juan Cruz Komar (born 13 August 1996) is an Argentine professional footballer who plays as a centre-back for Rosario Central.

Club career 

Komar is a youth exponent from Boca Juniors. At 3 November 2014, he made his first team debut in a league game against San Lorenzo de Almagro in a 2-0 away defeat. He played the entire game.
In January 2016, he started playing at Talleres.

References

Living people
1996 births
Argentine people of Ukrainian descent
Argentine footballers
Footballers from Rosario, Santa Fe
Association football defenders
Boca Juniors footballers
Talleres de Córdoba footballers
Rosario Central footballers
Argentine Primera División players